Narayanapala is  also the name of the second Kamboja ruler of Bengal (later half of 10th century AD). He was elder son of Rajyapala Kamboj, the founder of the Kamboja Dynasty of Bengal and succeeded him to the throne after his death.

References

Rulers of Bengal
Kambojas